Vicente Calderón Ramírez (born 15 December 1948) is a Mexican foil and sabre fencer. He competed at the 1968 and 1972 Summer Olympics.

References

External links
 

1948 births
Living people
Mexican male foil fencers
Olympic fencers of Mexico
Fencers at the 1968 Summer Olympics
Fencers at the 1972 Summer Olympics
Fencers from Mexico City
Pan American Games medalists in fencing
Pan American Games bronze medalists for Mexico
Fencers at the 1971 Pan American Games
Fencers at the 1975 Pan American Games
Mexican male sabre fencers
20th-century Mexican people